The 1993 Miami Dolphins season was the franchise's 28th season in the National Football League. 

The season was marked by Don Shula passing George Halas's record for most wins, against the Philadelphia Eagles. Also, during the Week 5 game against Cleveland, quarterback Dan Marino ruptured his Achilles' tendon and was lost for the remainder of the season. Quarterback Scott Mitchell filled in for Marino and was Player of the Month for October 1993. Mitchell, too, became injured, leaving the then 9–2 team in the hands of Doug Pederson and NFL veteran Steve DeBerg.

Rookie running back Terry Kirby led the team with 75 pass receptions, and free-agent acquisition Irving Fryar caught 64 passes for 1,010 yards.

The Dolphins had a record of 9–2 on Thanksgiving Day, but lost their final five games of the season, missing the playoffs altogether. As of the 2022 NFL season, the 1993 Miami Dolphins are the only team to reach 9-2 and not reach the playoffs.

Offseason

1993 NFL Draft

Staff

Roster

Regular season
On November 14, Don Shula became the winningest head coach in NFL history by winning his 325th game. The Dolphins beat the Philadelphia Eagles.

Schedule

Game summaries

Week 13

Week 16

Standings

References

Miami Dolphins on Pro Football Reference

Miami
Miami Dolphins seasons
Miami Dolphins